Jean-Jacques Bernard Craane (born 17 July 2003) is a Sint Maartener footballer who plays for Shaw University and the Sint Maarten national team.

Club career 
In August 2022 it was announced that Craane had committed to play college soccer in the United States for the Bears of Shaw University.

International career 
On 10 September 2018, Craane made his senior team debut for the Sint Maarten national team, in a 0–13 loss to Haiti in a 2019–20 CONCACAF Nations League qualifying match. Craane started and played the entire match.

Career statistics

International goals 

Scores and results list Sint Maarten's goal tally first, score column indicates score after each Williams goal.

Personal
Craane was born in Willemstad, Curaçao.

References

External links 
 
 

2003 births
Living people
Association football midfielders
Dutch Antillean footballers
People from Willemstad
Sint Maarten international footballers
Shaw Bears men's soccer players